Sara Errani was the defending champion and she retained her title, beating Carla Suárez Navarro in the final, 6–0, 6–4.

Seeds

Draw

Finals

Top half

Bottom half

Qualifying

Seeds

Qualifiers

Lucky loser
  Sharon Fichman

Draw

First qualifier

Second qualifier

Third qualifier

Fourth qualifier

External links
 WTA tournament draws

2013 Abierto Mexicano Telcel